The 2014–15 Arkansas Razorbacks men's basketball team represented the University of Arkansas in the 2014–15 NCAA Division I men's basketball season. The team's head coach was Mike Anderson. The team played their home games at Bud Walton Arena in Fayetteville, Arkansas, as a member of the SEC. They finished the season 27–9, 13–5 in SEC play to finish in second place. They advanced to the championship game of the SEC tournament where they lost to Kentucky. They received an at-large bid to the NCAA tournament where they defeated Wofford in the round of 64 before losing in the third round to North Carolina in the round of 32.

Preseason
Coach Mike Anderson completed his third season by posting a 22-12 record during the 2013-14 season, where the Razorbacks finished fifth in the SEC. The Razorbacks participated in the NIT, where they defeated Indiana State at home before losing to California on the road.

Incoming class

Roster

Schedule and results

|-
!colspan=12 style="background:#C41E3A; color:#FFFFFF;"| Exhibition

|-
!colspan=12 style="background:#C41E3A; color:#FFFFFF;"| Non-conference regular season

|-
!colspan=12 style="background:#C41E3A; color:#FFFFFF;"| SEC regular season

|-
!colspan=12 style="background:#C41E3A;"| SEC Tournament

|-
!colspan=12 style="background:#C41E3A;"| NCAA tournament

Source: 2014–15 Schedule

Rankings

References

Arkansas Razorbacks men's basketball seasons
Arkansas
Arkansas
Razor
Razor